In mathematics, a rectifiable set is a set that is smooth in a certain measure-theoretic sense. It is an extension of the idea of a rectifiable curve to higher dimensions; loosely speaking, a rectifiable set is a rigorous formulation of a piece-wise smooth set.  As such, it has many of the desirable properties of smooth manifolds, including tangent spaces that are defined almost everywhere. Rectifiable sets are the underlying object of study in geometric measure theory.

Definition
A Borel subset  of Euclidean space  is said to be -rectifiable set if  is of Hausdorff dimension , and there exist a countable collection  of continuously differentiable maps

such that the -Hausdorff measure  of

is zero. The backslash here denotes the set difference. Equivalently, the  may be taken to be Lipschitz continuous without altering the definition.

A set  is said to be purely -unrectifiable if for every (continuous, differentiable)  , one has

A standard example of a purely-1-unrectifiable set in two dimensions is the cross-product of the Smith–Volterra–Cantor set times itself.

Rectifiable sets in metric spaces 

 gives the following terminology for m-rectifiable sets E in a general metric space X.
 E is  rectifiable when there exists a Lipschitz map  for some bounded subset  of  onto .
 E is countably  rectifiable when E equals the union of a countable family of  rectifiable sets.
 E is countably  rectifiable when  is a measure on X and there is a countably  rectifiable set F such that .
 E is  rectifiable when E is countably  rectifiable and 

Notes

References

External links
 Rectifiable set at Encyclopedia of Mathematics

Measure theory